Kharazia is an Abkhazian surname. Notable people with the surname include:

Adgur Kharazia, Abkhazian politician
Vadim Kharazia, Abkhazian politician

Abkhaz-language surnames